The  is a district located in Ehime Prefecture, Japan.

As of 2004 the total population of 8,419 with a total area is 30.35 km2.

It consists of one town:
Kamijima

History
September 12, 1895 — The village of Yuge broke off the village of Uoshima.
April 1, 1897 — The Noma District was absorbed into the Ochi District. (1 town, 38 villages)
July 1, 1899 — The village of Kameyama broke off from the village of Uzuura. (1 town, 39 villages)
January 1, 1908 — The village of Hashihama gained town status. (2 towns, 38 villages)
January 1, 1908 — The village of Kikuma gained town status. (3 towns, 37 villages)
October 1, 1917 — The village of Sakurai gained town status. (4 towns, 36 villages)
February 11, 1920 — The town of Imabari and the village of Hiyoshi merged to form the city of Imabari. (3 towns, 35 villages)
April 1, 1925 — The village of Kasen merged into the town of Kikuma. (3 towns, 34 villages)
February 11, 1933 — The village of Chikami merged into the city of Imabari. (3 towns, 33 villages)
January 1, 1940 — The village of Tachibana merged into the city of Imabari. (3 towns, 31 villages)
November 1, 1940 — The village of Higashihakata gained town status to become the town of Hakata. (4 towns, 31 villages)
August 1, 1952 — The village of Miyakubo gained town status. (5 towns, 30 villages)
January 1, 1953 — The village of Yuge gained town status. (6 towns, 29 villages)
March 31, 1954 — The villages of Nibukawa, Kuwa, Kanbe, and Ryūoka merged to form the village of Tamagawa. (6 towns, 26 villages)
March 31, 1954  The villages of Tsukura, Kameyama, Uzuura, and Ōyama merged to form the town of Yoshiumi. (7 towns, 23 villages)
March 31, 1954 — Parts of the village of Ōyama merged into the town of Miyakubo. (7 towns, 22 villages)
January 1, 1955 — The village of Nishihakata merged into the town of Hakata. (8 towns, 20 villages)
February 1, 1955 — The towns of Sakurai, Tomita, the villages of Shimizu, Hitaka, Noma, and the town of Hashihama merged into the city of Imabari. (6 towns, 16 villages)
March 31, 1955 — The villages of Ōi and Konishi merged to form the town of Ōnishi. (7 towns, 14 villages)
March 31, 1955 — The villages of Setozaki and Moriguchi merged to form the village of Kamiura. (7 towns, 13 villages)
March 31, 1955 — The villages of Kagami and Miyaura merged to form the town of Ōmishima. (8 towns, 11 villages)
March 31, 1955 — The village of Kameoka merged into the town of Kikuma. (8 towns, 10 villages)
August 1, 1955 — parts of the town of Yoshiumi (Umashima Island) merged into the city of Imabari.
March 31, 1956 — The villages of Kamiasakura and Shimoasakura merged to form the village of Asakura. (8 towns, 9 villages)
September 23, 1956 — The village of Okayama merged into the town of Ōmishima. (8 towns, 8 villages)
March 1, 1960 — The village of Namikata gained town status. (9 towns, 7 villages)
May 1, 1960 — Parts of Oura in the town of Namikata merged into the city of Imabari.
April 1, 1962 — The village of Tamagawa gained town status. (10 towns, 6 villages)
April 1, 1964 — The village of Kamiura gained town status. (10 towns, 5 villages)
October 1, 2004 — The towns of Yuge, and the villages of Ikina, Iwagi, and Uoshima merged to form the town of Kamijima. (10 towns, 2 villages)
January 16, 2005 — The towns of Hakata, Kamiura, Kikuma, Miyakubo, Namikata, Ōmishima, Ōnishi, Tamagawa and Yoshiumi, and the villages of Asakura and Sekizen merged into the expanded city of Imabari. (1 town)

Ochi District